The Aviation Technical Museum is a large aviation museum located in Lugansk.

However, due to lack of funding, these planes and helicopters remained there, and subsequently were simply written off as scrap metal. It was then that it was decided to preserve these aircraft and they were added to the museum.

Helicopters

Aircraft

UAV

References

Museums in Luhansk Oblast
Aerospace museums in Ukraine
Military and war museums in Ukraine
Open-air museums in Ukraine